The cosmopolitan bee genus Ceratina, often referred to as small carpenter bees, is the sole lineage of the tribe Ceratinini, and is not closely related to the more familiar carpenter bees. The genus presently contains over 300 species in 23 subgenera. They make nests in dead wood, stems, or pith, and while many are solitary, a number are subsocial, with mothers caring for their larvae, and in a few cases where multiple females are found in a single nest, daughters or sisters may form very small, weakly eusocial colonies (where one bee forages and the other remains in the nest and lays eggs). One species is unique for having both social and asocial populations, Ceratina australensis, which exhibits all of the pre-adaptations for successful group living. This species is socially polymorphic with both solitary and social nests collected in sympatry. Social colonies in that species consist of two foundresses, one contributing both foraging and reproductive effort and the second which remains at the nest as a passive guard. Cooperative nesting provides no overt reproductive benefits over solitary nesting in this population, although brood survival tends to be greater in social colonies. Maternal longevity, subsociality and bivoltine nesting phenology in this species favour colony formation, while dispersal habits and offspring longevity may inhibit more frequent social nesting in this and other ceratinines.

Ceratina are commonly dark, shining, even metallic bees, with fairly sparse body hairs and a weak scopa on the hind tibia. Most species have some yellow markings, most often restricted to the face, but often elsewhere on the body. They are very commonly mistaken for "sweat bees" (family Halictidae), due to their small size, metallic coloration, and some similarity in wing venation; they can be easily separated from halictids by the mouthparts (with a long glossa) and the hindwings (with a tiny jugal lobe).

In Ceratina nigrolabiata, a Mediterranean species, males may guard the opening to the nest of a female they hope to mate with, and are often not the father of the brood within the nest; this is the first bee species in which male nest-guarding has been classified as a form of biparental care, but males guarding nests and mating with females has been documented in other species (e.g., Macrotera portalis).

A few species of Ceratina are exceptional among bees in that they are parthenogenetic, reproducing without males.

Species

 Ceratina acantha Provancher, 1895
 Ceratina accusator Cockerell, 1919
 Ceratina acuta Friese, 1896
 Ceratina aeneiceps Friese, 1917
 Ceratina aenescens Friese, 1917
 Ceratina aereola Vachal, 1903
 Ceratina aetana Shiokawa, 2006
 Ceratina ahngeri Kokujev, 1905
 Ceratina albopicta Cockerell, 1937
 Ceratina albosticta Cockerell, 1931
 Ceratina alexandrae Baker, 2002
 Ceratina aliceae Cockerell, 1937
 Ceratina allodapoides Strand, 1912
 Ceratina aloes Cockerell, 1932
 Ceratina angulata Roig-Alsina, 2013
 Ceratina apacheorum Daly, 1973
 Ceratina apatela Engel, 2018
 Ceratina arabiae (Daly, 1983)
 Ceratina arizonensis Cockerell, 1898
 Ceratina armata Smith, 1854
 Ceratina aspera Schrottky, 1902
 Ceratina asunciana Strand, 1910
 Ceratina asuncionis Strand, 1910
 Ceratina atopura Cockerell, 1937
 Ceratina atra Friese, 1917
 Ceratina atrata H. S. Smith, 1907
 Ceratina augochloroides Ducke, 1911
 Ceratina auriviridis H. S. Smith, 1907
 Ceratina australensis (Perkins, 1912)
 Ceratina azteca Cresson, 1878
 Ceratina azurea Benoist, 1955
 Ceratina ballotae Eardley & Daly, 2007
 Ceratina barbarae Eardley & Daly, 2007
 Ceratina basaltica Flórez-Gómez et al., 2022
 Ceratina beata Cameron, 1897
 Ceratina belizensis Baker, 1907
 Ceratina belliata Shiokawa, 2008
 Ceratina benguetensis Cockerell, 1916
 Ceratina bhawani Bingham, 1908
 Ceratina bicolorata Smith, 1879
 Ceratina bicuneata Cockerell, 1918
 Ceratina bifida Friese, 1900
 Ceratina biguttulata (Moure, 1941)
 Ceratina bilobata Cockerell, 1937
 Ceratina binghami Cockerell, 1908
 Ceratina bispinosa Handlirsch, 1889
 Ceratina boninensis Yasumatsu, 1955
 Ceratina braunsi Eardley & Daly, 2007
 Ceratina braunsiana Friese, 1905
 Ceratina breviceps Michener, 1954
 Ceratina bryanti Cockerell, 1919
 Ceratina buscki Cockerell, 1919
 Ceratina calcarata Robertson, 1900
 Ceratina callosa (Fabricius, 1794)
 Ceratina canaliculata Roig-Alsina, 2016
 Ceratina canarensis Cockerell, 1919
 Ceratina capitosa Smith, 1879
 Ceratina carinifrons Baker, 2002
 Ceratina catamarcensis Schrottky, 1907
 Ceratina caveata Roig-Alsina, 2013
 Ceratina cavifrons Shiokawa, 2006
 Ceratina chalcea Spinola, 1841
 Ceratina chalcites Germar, 1839
 Ceratina chalybea Chevrier, 1872
 Ceratina chiangmaiensis Warrit et al., 2012
 Ceratina chinensis (Wu, 1963)
 Ceratina chloris (Fabricius, 1804)
 Ceratina christellae Terzo, 1998
 Ceratina chrysocephala Cockerell, 1912
 Ceratina chrysomalla Gerstäcker, 1869
 Ceratina citrinifrons Cockerell, 1937
 Ceratina citriphila Cockerell, 1935
 Ceratina cladura Cockerell, 1919
 Ceratina claripennis Friese, 1917
 Ceratina cobaltina Cresson, 1878
 Ceratina cockerelli H. S. Smith, 1907
 Ceratina cognata Smith, 1879
 Ceratina collusor Cockerell, 1919
 Ceratina combinata Friese, 1910
 Ceratina compacta Smith, 1879
 Ceratina congoensis Meunier, 1890
 Ceratina coptica Baker, 2002
 Ceratina corinna Nurse, 1904
 Ceratina correntina Schrottky, 1907
 Ceratina cosmiocephala Cameron, 1908
 Ceratina crassiceps Friese, 1925
 Ceratina crewi Cockerell, 1903
 Ceratina cucurbitina (Rossi, 1792)
 Ceratina cupreiventris Smith, 1879
 Ceratina cuprifrons Strand, 1910
 Ceratina currani Schwarz, 1934
 Ceratina cyanea (Kirby, 1802)
 Ceratina cyanicollis Schrottky, 1902
 Ceratina cyaniventris Cresson, 1865
 Ceratina cyanura Cockerell, 1918
 Ceratina cypriaca Mavromoustakis, 1954
 Ceratina dallatorreana Friese, 1896
 Ceratina dalyi Terzo, 1998
 Ceratina daressalamica Strand, 1912
 Ceratina darwini Friese, 1910
 Ceratina demotica Baker, 2002
 Ceratina denesi Terzo, 1998
 Ceratina dentipes Friese, 1914
 Ceratina dentiventris Gerstäcker, 1869
 Ceratina diligens Smith, 1879
 Ceratina diloloensis Cockerell, 1932
 Ceratina dimidiata Friese, 1910
 Ceratina diodonta H. S. Smith, 1907
 Ceratina duckei Friese, 1910
 Ceratina dupla Say, 1837
 Ceratina egeria Nurse, 1904
 Ceratina electron Cockerell, 1937
 Ceratina elisabethae Cockerell, 1937
 Ceratina emeiensis Wu, 2000
 Ceratina ericia Vachal, 1903
 Ceratina esakii Yasumatsu & Hirashima, 1969
 Ceratina excavata Cockerell, 1937
 Ceratina eximia Smith, 1862
 Ceratina fastigiata Fox, 1896
 Ceratina ferghanica Morawitz, 1875
 Ceratina fimbriata Roig-Alsina, 2013
 Ceratina fioreseana Oliveira, 2020
 Ceratina flavipes Smith, 1879
 Ceratina flavolateralis Cockerell, 1916
 Ceratina flavopicta Smith, 1858
 Ceratina floridana Mitchell, 1962
 Ceratina foveifera Strand, 1912
 Ceratina fuliginosa Cockerell, 1916
 Ceratina fulvitarsis Friese, 1925
 Ceratina fulvofasciata Ducke, 1908
 Ceratina fumipennis Friese, 1917
 Ceratina glossata Michener, 1954
 Ceratina gnoma Eardley & Daly, 2007
 Ceratina gomphrenae Schrottky, 1909
 Ceratina gossypii Schrottky, 1907
 Ceratina grandis Shiokawa, 2015
 Ceratina gravidula Gerstäcker, 1869
 Ceratina guarnacciana Genaro, 1998
 Ceratina guineae Strand, 1912
 Ceratina gurkhana Shiokawa, 2008
 Ceratina hakkarica Kocourek, 1998
 Ceratina haladai Terzo & Rasmont, 2004
 Ceratina hexae Eardley & Daly, 2007
 Ceratina hieratica Baker, 2002
 Ceratina hieroglyphica Smith, 1854
 Ceratina himalayana Shiokawa, 2008
 Ceratina huberi Friese, 1910
 Ceratina humilior Cockerell, 1916
 Ceratina hurdi Daly, 1973
 Ceratina ignara Cresson, 1878
 Ceratina immaculata Friese, 1910
 Ceratina incertula Cockerell, 1937
 Ceratina incognita Bingham, 1898
 Ceratina indica (Hirashima, 1969)
 Ceratina indigovirens Flórez-Gómez et al., 2022
 Ceratina inermis Friese, 1905
 Ceratina interrupta Alfken, 1926
 Ceratina itzarum Cockerell, 1931
 Ceratina iwatai Yasumatsu, 1936
 Ceratina jacobsoni van der Vecht, 1952
 Ceratina japonica Cockerell, 1911
 Ceratina jejuensis S. Lee, 2005
 Ceratina kankauensis Strand, 1913
 Ceratina kopili Flórez-Gómez et al., 2022
 Ceratina kosemponis Strand, 1913
 Ceratina kraussi Michener, 1954
 Ceratina labrosa Friese, 1905
 Ceratina laevifrons Morawitz, 1895
 Ceratina laeviuscula Wu, 1963
 Ceratina langenburgiae Strand, 1912
 Ceratina langi Cockerell, 1934
 Ceratina latisetis Roig-Alsina, 2013
 Ceratina lativentris Friese, 1905
 Ceratina lehmanni Friese, 1910
 Ceratina lepida Smith, 1879
 Ceratina liberica Cockerell, 1937
 Ceratina lieftincki van der Vecht, 1952
 Ceratina liliputana Cockerell, 1932
 Ceratina lineola Vachal, 1903
 Ceratina litoraria van der Vecht, 1952
 Ceratina loa Strand, 1912
 Ceratina loewi Gerstäcker, 1869
 Ceratina longiceps Smith, 1879
 Ceratina loquata Nurse, 1902
 Ceratina lucidula Smith, 1854
 Ceratina lucifera Cockerell, 1934
 Ceratina ludwigsi Strand, 1914
 Ceratina lunata Friese, 1905
 Ceratina maai Shiokawa & Hirashima, 1982
 Ceratina macondiana Flórez-Gómez & Griswold, 2020
 Ceratina maculifrons Smith, 1854
 Ceratina madecassa Friese, 1900
 Ceratina maghrebensis Daly, 1983
 Ceratina malindiae (Daly, 1988)
 Ceratina mandibularis Friese, 1896
 Ceratina manni Cockerell, 1912
 Ceratina marginata Baker, 1907
 Ceratina mariannensis Yasumatsu, 1939
 Ceratina mauritanica Lepeletier, 1841
 Ceratina megastigmata Yasumatsu & Hirashima, 1969
 Ceratina melanochroa (Moure, 1941)
 Ceratina melanoptera Cockerell, 1924
 Ceratina mendozina Roig-Alsina, 2016
 Ceratina metaria Cockerell, 1920
 Ceratina mexicana Cresson, 1878
 Ceratina micheneri Daly, 1973
 Ceratina mikmaqi Rehan & Sheffield, 2011
 Ceratina minima Friese, 1909
 Ceratina minuta Friese, 1905
 Ceratina mocsaryi Friese, 1896
 Ceratina moderata Cameron, 1897
 Ceratina moerenhouti Vachal, 1903
 Ceratina monstrata Sung & Shiokawa, 2012
 Ceratina montana Holmberg, 1886
 Ceratina morawitzi Sickmann, 1894
 Ceratina moricei Friese, 1899
 Ceratina morrensis Strand, 1910
 Ceratina muelleri Friese, 1910
 Ceratina muscatella Nurse, 1902
 Ceratina namibensis Eardley & Daly, 2007
 Ceratina nanula Cockerell, 1897
 Ceratina nasalis Friese, 1905
 Ceratina nasiinsignita Strand, 1912
 Ceratina nativitatis Cockerell, 1937
 Ceratina nautlana Cockerell, 1897
 Ceratina neocallosa Daly, 1983
 Ceratina neomexicana Cockerell, 1901
 Ceratina nigra Handlirsch, 1889
 Ceratina nigriceps Friese, 1905
 Ceratina nigrita Ashmead, 1900
 Ceratina nigritula Michener, 1954
 Ceratina nigroaenea Gerstäcker, 1869
 Ceratina nigrolabiata Friese, 1896
 Ceratina nigrolateralis Cockerell, 1916
 Ceratina nilotica Cockerell, 1937
 Ceratina nitidella Cockerell, 1937
 Ceratina nitidifrons Roig-Alsina,  2016
 Ceratina nyassensis Strand, 1912
 Ceratina obtusicauda Cockerell, 1919
 Ceratina okinawana Matsumura & Uchida, 1926
 Ceratina opaca Friese, 1905
 Ceratina opipara Shiokawa, 2015
 Ceratina oxalidis Schrottky, 1907
 Ceratina pacifica H. S. Smith, 1907
 Ceratina pacis Cockerell, 1937
 Ceratina palauensis Yasumatsu, 1939
 Ceratina papuana van der Vecht, 1952
 Ceratina paraguayensis Schrottky, 1907
 Ceratina parvula Smith, 1854
 Ceratina paulyi (Daly, 1988)
 Ceratina pembana Cockerell, 1935
 Ceratina penicillata Friese, 1905
 Ceratina penicilligera Strand, 1912
 Ceratina perforatrix Smith, 1879
 Ceratina perpolita Cockerell, 1937
 Ceratina personata Friese, 1905
 Ceratina picta Smith, 1854
 Ceratina pictifrons Smith, 1861
 Ceratina piracicabana Schrottky, 1911
 Ceratina placida Smith, 1862
 Ceratina polita Friese, 1902
 Ceratina politifrons Cockerell, 1937
 Ceratina politula Shiokawa, 2006
 Ceratina popovi Wu, 1963
 Ceratina propinqua Cameron, 1897
 Ceratina psaenythia Engel, 2018
 Ceratina pubescens Smith, 1879
 Ceratina pulchripes Shiokawa, 2002
 Ceratina punctaticeps Van der Vecht, 1953
 Ceratina punctigena Cockerell, 1916
 Ceratina punctiventris Friese, 1910
 Ceratina punctulata Spinola, 1841
 Ceratina pusilla Roig-Alsina, 2016
 Ceratina quadripunctata Wu, 2000
 Ceratina quinquemaculata Cockerell, 1912
 Ceratina raquelitae Flórez-Gómez & Ayala, 2022
 Ceratina rasmonti Terzo, 1998
 Ceratina rectangulifera Schwarz & Michener, 1954
 Ceratina regalis Cockerell, 1912
 Ceratina rehanae Flórez-Gómez & Ayala, 2022
 Ceratina rhodura Cockerell, 1937
 Ceratina richardsoniae Schrottky, 1909
 Ceratina ridleyi Cockerell, 1910
 Ceratina roseoviridis Cockerell, 1937
 Ceratina rossi (Daly, 1988)
 Ceratina rothschildiana Vachal, 1909
 Ceratina rotundiceps Smith, 1879
 Ceratina rufigastra Cockerell, 1937
 Ceratina rufipes Smith, 1879
 Ceratina rugifrons Smith, 1879
 Ceratina rugosissima Cockerell, 1932
 Ceratina rukaina Sung & Shiokawa, 2012
 Ceratina rupestris Holmberg, 1884
 Ceratina ruwenzorica Cockerell, 1937
 Ceratina sakagamii Terzo, 1998
 Ceratina sakagamina Shiokawa, 2015
 Ceratina samburuensis Cockerell, 1910
 Ceratina sapphira Flórez-Gómez & Ayala, 2022
 Ceratina satoi Yasumatsu, 1936
 Ceratina saundersi Daly, 1983
 Ceratina sauteri Strand, 1913
 Ceratina schwarzi Kocourek, 1998
 Ceratina schwarziana Terzo, 1998
 Ceratina sclerops Schrottky, 1907
 Ceratina sculpturata Smith, 1858
 Ceratina seikii Sung & Shiokawa, 2012
 Ceratina senegalensis Strand, 1912
 Ceratina sequoiae Michener, 1936
 Ceratina sericea Friese, 1910
 Ceratina shinnersi Daly, 1973
 Ceratina silvicola Shiokawa, 2015
 Ceratina simillima Smith, 1854
 Ceratina smaragdula (Fabricius, 1787)
 Ceratina spectata Shiokawa, 2015
 Ceratina speculifrons Cockerell, 1920
 Ceratina speculina Cockerell, 1937
 Ceratina spilota Cockerell, 1932
 Ceratina spinipes Shiokawa, 2009
 Ceratina splendida Shiokawa, 2008
 Ceratina stilbonota Moure, 1941
 Ceratina strenua Smith, 1879
 Ceratina stuckenbergi Eardley & Daly, 2007
 Ceratina subcarinata Roig-Alsina, 2013
 Ceratina subquadrata Smith, 1854
 Ceratina subscintilla Cockerell, 1937
 Ceratina sutepensis Cockerell, 1929
 Ceratina tabescens Cockerell, 1912
 Ceratina taborae Strand, 1912
 Ceratina takasagona Shiokawa & Hirashima, 1982
 Ceratina takeshii Shiokawa, 2008
 Ceratina tanganyicensis Strand, 1911
 Ceratina tanoi Shiokawa, 2010
 Ceratina tantilla (Moure, 1941)
 Ceratina tarsata Morawitz, 1872
 Ceratina tejonensis Cresson, 1864
 Ceratina tenkeana Cockerell, 1937
 Ceratina tepetlana Flórez-Gómez et al., 2022
 Ceratina teunisseni Terzo & Rasmont, 1997
 Ceratina texana Daly, 1973
 Ceratina tibialis Morawitz, 1895
 Ceratina timberlakei Daly, 1973
 Ceratina titusi Cockerell, 1903
 Ceratina triangulifera Cockerell, 1914
 Ceratina tricolor Michener, 1954
 Ceratina trimaculata Friese, 1917
 Ceratina tropica Crawford, 1910
 Ceratina truncata Friese, 1905
 Ceratina tucumana Roig-Alsina, 2013
 Ceratina turgida (Moure, 1941)
 Ceratina umbricosta Roig-Alsina, 2013
 Ceratina unicolor Friese, 1911
 Ceratina unimaculata Smith, 1879
 Ceratina velthuisi Terzo & Rasmont, 2001
 Ceratina verhoeffi Terzo & Rasmont, 1997
 Ceratina vernoniae Schrottky, 1920
 Ceratina virescens Friese, 1910
 Ceratina viridicincta Cockerell, 1931
 Ceratina viridifrons Cockerell, 1934
 Ceratina viridis Guérin-Méneville, 1844
 Ceratina volitans Schrottky, 1907
 Ceratina wagneri Friese, 1910
 Ceratina waini (Shiokawa & Sakagami, 1969)
 Ceratina warnckei Terzo, 1998
 Ceratina whiteheadi Eardley & Daly, 2007
 Ceratina xanthocera (Moure, 1941)
 Ceratina xanthostoma Cockerell, 1912
 Ceratina yamanei Sung & Shiokawa, 2012
 Ceratina yasumatsui Hirashima, 1971
 Ceratina yonagunensis Shiokawa, 2011
 Ceratina yucatanica Cockerell, 1931
 Ceratina zandeni Terzo, 1998
 Ceratina zeteki Cockerell, 1934
 Ceratina zwakhalsi Terzo & Rasmont, 1997

 † Ceratina disrupta  (Cockerell 1906)

References

External links
  Guide to the Ceratina of Eastern North America. USGS Patuxent Wildlife Research Center.

 
Bee genera